Suburban Minneapolis-based Allianz Life Insurance Company of North America (Allianz Life) provides annuities and life insurance products in the United States in all states except for New York. In New York, annuities and life insurance products are offered by Allianz Life Insurance Company of New York (Allianz Life of NY).

Allianz Life offers various products, including fixed and variable annuities and life insurance. These products are offered through a network of more than 100,000 agents nationwide.

The company is a principal subsidiary of Allianz SE, a European global financial services group that is the 31st largest corporation in the world based on revenue (Fortune Global 500, July 2013). Allianz SE employs nearly 155,000 people worldwide.

History 

Allianz Life Insurance Company of North America began as North American Casualty, started by Henry M. Little of Minneapolis, Minnesota in 1896. In 1912, North American Casualty merged with North American Life Association – founded in 1905 by Zeke H. Austin with capital from Henry Little – to become North American Life and Casualty (NALAC). Howell Palmeroy Skoglund (known as H. P. Skoglund) was the company's president from 1933 to 1965 as well as one of the original owners of the Minnesota Vikings.

In 1979, North American Life and Casualty Co. was acquired by Allianz, a German conglomerate, which renamed the company Allianz Life Insurance Co. of North America in 1993. Founded in 1890, Allianz is now one of the world’s largest integrated financial services organizations with asset management, life, health and property-casualty insurance, and banking operations in more than 70 countries.

Today, Allianz Life and Allianz Life of NY are the only Allianz Group subsidiaries providing life insurance in the U.S.

In 2010, Allianz Life was recognized by the Minneapolis Star Tribune as one of the top 100 workplaces in the Twin Cities, ranking fifth on the list of top public companies. Allianz Life was also honored that year as one of Minneapolis/St. Paul Business Journal’s Best Places to Work winners, ranking eighth on the list of large companies with more than 1,000 full-time Minnesota employees.

On July 25, 2017, Allianz became the title sponsor of MLS's Minnesota United FC stadium in Saint Paul, Allianz Field.

In July 2020, SIMON Annuities and Insurance Services LLC was delighted to add Allianz Life Insurance Company of North America to the Raymond James investment management annuity network and digital marketplace.

References

External links 
 Official site

Allianz
American companies established in 1896
Financial services companies established in 1896
Insurance companies of the United States
Companies based in Minneapolis